A Thin Ghost and Others is a horror short story collection by British writer M. R. James, published in 1919. It was his third short collection.

Contents of the original edition
 "The Residence at Whitminster"
 "The Diary of Mr Poynter"
 "An Episode of Cathedral History"
 "The Story of a Disappearance and an Appearance"
 "Two Doctors"

References

Sources

External links

 
 

1919 short story collections
Short story collections by M. R. James
Ghosts in written fiction
Ghost stories